Suleh Dugal (also Romanized as Sūleh Dūgal; also known as Sūleh Dogal and Sūreh Dūkal) is a village in Margavar Rural District, Silvaneh District, Urmia County, West Azerbaijan Province, Iran. At the 2006 census, its population was 142, in 27 families.

References 

Populated places in Urmia County